The 2009–10 DFB-Pokal was the 67th season of the annual German football cup competition. The competition began with the first round on 31 July 2009 and ended on 15 May 2010 with the final which is traditionally held at Olympiastadion in Berlin. Since the cup winner, Bayern Munich, completed the double by also winning the German championship, and the runner-up, Werder Bremen, qualified for the Champions League, VfB Stuttgart, the sixth-placed team of the championship, qualified for the 2010–11 UEFA Europa League third qualifying round instead.

Participating clubs
The following 64 teams competed in the first round:

Draw
The draws for the different rounds are conducted as following: For the first round, the participating teams will be split into two pots. The first pot contains all teams which have qualified through their regional cup competitions, the best four teams of the 3rd Liga and the bottom four teams of the Second Bundesliga. Every team from this pot will be drawn to a team from the second pot, which contains all remaining professional teams. The teams from the first pot will be set as the home team in the process.

The two-pot scenario will also be applied for the second round, with the remaining 3rd Liga/amateur teams in the first pot and the remaining professional teams in the other pot. Once one pot is empty, the remaining pairings will be drawn from the other pot with the first-drawn team for a match serving as hosts. For the remaining rounds, the draw will be conducted from just one pot. Any remaining 3rd Liga/amateur team will be the home team if drawn against a professional team. In every other case, the first-drawn team will serve as hosts.

Matches

First round
The draw took place on 27 June 2009, 18:00 UTC+2 at the Norisring, Nuremberg, and involved the 64 teams listed in the table above. Germany international Renate Lingor conducted the draw. The matches will be played from 31 July – 3 August 2009.

Second round
The draw took place on 8 August 2009 at Rhein-Neckar-Arena, Sinsheim and involved the 32 winners of the first round. Germany international Inka Grings conducted the draw. The matches were played on 22–23 September 2009.

Round of 16

Quarter-finals
The draw took place on 1 November 2009 as part of the ARD-Sportschau, and involved the 8 winners of the round of 16. Germany international Linda Bresonik conducted the draw. The matches will be played on 9–10 February 2010.

Semi-finals
The draw was conducted on 10 February.

Final

References

External links
 
DFB-Pokal on kicker.de 

2009–10
2009–10 in German football cups